Peptidyl-glutamate 4-carboxylase (vitamin K-dependent carboxylase, gamma-glutamyl carboxylase) is an enzyme with systematic name peptidyl-glutamate 4-carboxylase (2-methyl-3-phytyl-1,4-naphthoquinone-epoxidizing). This enzyme catalyses the following chemical reaction

 peptidyl-4-carboxyglutamate + 2,3-epoxyphylloquinone + H2O  peptidyl-glutamate + CO2 + O2 + phylloquinone

The enzyme can use various vitamin-K derivatives, including menaquinone.

References

External links 
 

EC 4.1.1